State Route 310 (SR 310), also known as Mecca Pike, is a short east–west state highway in McMinn County, Tennessee. It connects Etowah, via SR 39, to Tellico Plains.

Route description

SR 310 begins in Etowah at an intersection with US 411/SR 30 (Tennessee Avenue/SR 33). It goes east to cross a bridge over some railroad tracks before leaving Etowah and going down a narrow valley between mountains. SR 310 passes through the community of Conasauga before passing along the edge of the Cherokee National Forest, to the south, before entering the community of Mecca. It crosses a bridge over a creek before coming to an end at an intersection with SR 39.

SR 310 is a two-lane rural highway for its entire length.

Major intersections

References

310
Transportation in McMinn County, Tennessee